Hyderabad Institute of Arts, Science And Technology or HiAST is a private degree awarding institution located in Hyderabad, Pakistan. It was established on 1 August 2001, and in February 2013 was chartered under The Hyderabad Institute of Arts, Science and Technology Act, 2013. It has Higher Education Commission of Pakistan-recognized affiliations with both the University of Sindh and Mehran University of Engineering and Technology.

College, Undergraduate and Graduate Courses 
SSC program affiliated with the Board of Intermediate and Secondary Education, Hyderabad
HSC program affiliated with the Board of Intermediate and Secondary Education, Hyderabad
BBA program affiliated with University of Sindh
MBA program affiliated with University of Sindh
BS (Information Technology) Program affiliated with Mehran University of Engineering and Technology
MS (Information Technology) Program affiliated with Mehran University of Engineering and Technology

References

2001 establishments in Pakistan
Educational institutions established in 2001
Academic institutions in Pakistan